Bambusa ventricosa is a species of bamboo which is native to Vietnam and to Guangdong province in southern China. The species is widely cultivated in subtropical regions around the world for the bulbous and ornamental stems. The species is used in bonsai.

Common names include Buddha bamboo and Buddha's-belly bamboo.

References

ventricosa
Flora of Guangdong
Flora of Vietnam
Plants described in 1938